Walter Marvin Koenig (born September 14, 1936) is an American actor and screenwriter. He began acting professionally in the mid 1960s and quickly rose to prominence for his supporting role as Ensign Pavel Chekov in Star Trek: The Original Series (1967–1969). He went on to reprise this role in all six original-cast Star Trek films. He has also acted in several other series and films including Goodbye, Raggedy Ann (1971), The Questor Tapes (1974), and Babylon 5 (1993). In addition to his acting career, Koenig has made a career in writing as well and is known for working on Land of the Lost (1974), Family (1976), What Really Happened to the Class of '65? (1977) and The Powers of Matthew Star (1982).

Early life
Koenig was born in Chicago, Illinois, the son of businessman Isadore Koenig and his wife Sarah (née Strauss). They moved to the Inwood neighborhood of Manhattan when Walter was a child, where he went to school. Koenig's parents were Russian Jewish immigrants from the Soviet Union; his family had been living in Lithuania when they emigrated, and they shortened their surname from "Königsberg" to "Koenig".

Koenig's father was a communist who was investigated by the FBI during the McCarthy era. Koenig attended Grinnell College in Grinnell, Iowa, with a pre-med major. He transferred to UCLA and received a Bachelor of Arts in psychology. After a professor encouraged Koenig to become an actor, he attended Neighborhood Playhouse School of the Theatre in New York City with fellow students Dabney Coleman, Christopher Lloyd, and James Caan.

Career

Early work
In Gene Roddenberry's first television production, the 1963–64 NBC series The Lieutenant, Koenig played a significant role as noncom Sgt. John Delwyn, who is recommended for Officer Candidates School by the series protagonist, Lt William T. (Tiberius) Rice, played by Gary Lockwood; (in episode 27, "Mother Enemy", aired on April 4, 1964). The plot twist, at the height of the US–Soviet Cold War, is that Sgt Delwyn's visiting mother is a prominent, and politically active, American Communist Party member. This sets up various interesting plot tensions involving Delwyn, Rice, and Rice's CO, Capt. Rambridge, played by Robert Vaughn.
In 1964, Koenig portrayed a New York City juvenile gang leader in an adaptation of Memos from Purgatory for The Alfred Hitchcock Hour.

Star Trek

Koenig began playing Ensign Pavel Chekov, navigator on the USS Enterprise, in the original Star Trek television series in the second season, and continued in the role in all of the films featuring the original cast, including Star Trek Generations.

One of only two actors to audition, he was cast as Chekov almost immediately primarily because of his resemblance to British actor and singer Davy Jones of the Monkees. Show creator Gene Roddenberry hoped that Koenig would increase the show's appeal to young people. (The studio's publicity department, however, falsely ascribed the inclusion of Chekov to an article in Pravda that complained about the lack of Russians in Star Trek.)

As the 30-year-old's hair was already receding, costume designers fashioned a Davy Jones-style "moptop" hairpiece for him. In later episodes, his own hair grew out enough to accomplish the look with a comb-over.

Roddenberry asked him to "ham up" his Russian accent to add a note of comic relief to the series. Chekov's accent has been criticized as inauthentic, in particular Koenig's substituting the "w" sound in place of a "v" sound (e.g., "wodka" for "vodka"); Koenig has said the accent was inspired by his father, who had the same difficulty with the "v" sound.

Most of Koenig's fan mail indeed came from children, and the high volume of letters contributed to his soon receiving a contract as a regular cast member; this surprised Koenig, who had been told that Chekov would be a recurring role. When the early Season 2 episodes of Star Trek were shot, George Takei was delayed while completing the movie The Green Berets, so Chekov was joined at the Enterprise helm by a different character. When Takei returned, the two had to share a dressing room and a single episode script. This reportedly angered Takei to the point where he nearly left the show (although Koenig observed in a 2016 interview that, whilst sharing a dressing room with Takei and James Doohan, they recognised their status as supporting players, and "didn't think twice about it"), but the two actors have since become good friends, to the point that Koenig was the best man at Takei's wedding in 2008.

The Chekov character never appeared in the animated Star Trek. Though the show's producers had decided not to cast him for budgetary reasons, and purchased his script for an episode of the series titled "The Infinite Vulcan", Koenig later confessed that he was upset at being left out of the cast. "The Infinite Vulcan" makes him the first cast member to write a Star Trek story for television.

He received Saturn Award nominations for Best Supporting Actor in a Film for both Star Trek II: The Wrath of Khan and Star Trek IV: The Voyage Home. Koenig reprised the role of Chekov for the fan webseries Star Trek: New Voyages, "To Serve All My Days", and the independent Sky Conway/Tim Russ film, Star Trek: Of Gods and Men, both in 2006, and Star Trek: Renegades in 2015. According to the teaser for Renegades episodes 2 and 3, this would be the last time Koenig played the role of Chekov.

Later work

After Star Trek, and before the movies started, Koenig found some work as a writer. He submitted freelance scripts to a number of shows, and was the main writer on the show What Really Happened to the Class of '65?.

After Chekov, Koenig had a recurring role as Psi Cop Alfred Bester on the television series Babylon 5. He was a "Special Guest Star" in twelve episodes and, at the end of the third season, the production company applied for an Emmy nomination on his behalf. He was slated to play Bester on the spin-off series Crusade, but the series was cancelled before his episode was filmed. The character name of "Alfred Bester" was an homage to the science-fiction writer of the same name.

Koenig played "Oro" in two episodes of the Canadian science fiction television series The Starlost, which aired in 1973 on Canada's CTV television network. He filmed a few FMV sequences for a re-released copy of the game Star Trek Starfleet Academy for PCs.
The game was later cancelled, but considerable footage from it was recycled for the film Game Over, with Koenig's dialogue dubbed over in order to retrofit his performance into the role of a computer hard drive.

Koenig's film, stage, and TV roles span fifty years. He has played roles ranging from a teenage gang leader (Alfred Hitchcock Presents) to Scandinavian fiancé Gunnar in the Gidget episode entitled "Gidget's Foreign Policy", to a Las Vegas entertainer (I Spy).  He returned to space with a starring role in Moontrap and played a futuristic dictator in the video game Maximum Surge.

During the early 1990s, he starred in a touring production of the play The Boys in Autumn, playing a middle aged Tom Sawyer, who reunites with childhood friend Huckleberry Finn. Fellow Trek actor Mark Lenard played Finn.

In addition to acting, he has written several films (I Wish I May, You're Never Alone When You're a Schizophrenic), one-act plays, and a handful of episodes for TV shows: Star Trek: The Animated Series, Land of the Lost, Family and The Powers of Matthew Star.

He has written several books, including Warped Factors: A Neurotic's Guide to the Universe (an autobiography), Chekov's Enterprise (a journal kept during the filming of Star Trek: The Motion Picture) and Buck Alice and the Actor-Robot (a science fiction novel), which was re-released in 2006. He created his own comic book series called Raver, which was published by Malibu Comics in the early 1990s, and appeared as a "special guest star" in an issue of the comic book Eternity Smith, which features him prominently on its cover.

In 2013, he released the graphic novel Walter Koenig's Things To Come with artist J.C. Baez, published by Bluewater Comics, which compiled the four issues of the miniseries of the same name.

Koenig has taught classes in acting and directing at UCLA, the Sherwood Oaks Experimental Film College, the Actor's Alley Repertory Company in Los Angeles, and the California School of Professional Psychology at Alliant International University. In 2002, he directed stage versions of two of the original Twilight Zone episodes for Letter Entertainment.

In 1987, Koenig directed his original one-act play The Secret Life of Lily Langtree at the Theatre of NOTE in Los Angeles. In 1989, Koenig starred in the science fiction film Moontrap as Mission commander Colonel Jason Grant.

In 1997, Koenig starred in Drawing Down the Moon, an independent film about a Wiccan woman who attempts to open a homeless shelter in a small Pennsylvania town. Koenig played Joe Merchant, a local crime lord obsessed with chaos theory who sends his thugs to intimidate her into shutting down the shelter.

In 2004, Koenig co-starred in Mad Cowgirl, an independent movie about a meat-packing health inspector dying from a brain disorder, in which he played televangelist Pastor Dylan. The movie played the SF Indiefest and the Silverlake Film Festival, followed by a limited release in major cities. Mad Cowgirl was released on DVD on December 5, 2006.

In 2007, he reunited with fellow Babylon 5 star Bruce Boxleitner for the movie Bone Eater.

Koenig received the 2,479th star of the Hollywood Walk of Fame on September 10, 2012.

In 2013, Koenig ventured into the steampunk genre, starring in the short film Cowboys & Engines alongside Malcolm McDowell and Richard Hatch. He played an evil newspaper tycoon in Blue Dream from director Gregory Hatanaka. In 2017, Koenig appeared in the 1980s throwback Neil Stryker and the Tyrant of Time from director Rob Taylor, battling puppet goblins as science officer Ray Nabroski.

In 2018, he again appeared opposite Hatch in the science-fiction drama Diminuendo, which was Hatch's last performance before his death.

Humanitarian work 
In 2007, Koenig was asked by the human rights group U.S. Campaign for Burma to help in their grassroots campaign about the humanitarian crisis in Burma. As detailed on his official website, he visited refugee camps along the Burma–Thailand border from July 16 to 25, 2007.

Personal life
Koenig married actress Judy Levitt in 1965; she died in 2022. In 1968, they had a son, actor Andrew, who died in 2010. They have a daughter, Danielle, a comedienne and writer, who is married to comedian Jimmy Pardo.

In September 2008, Koenig served as best man at the wedding of his Star Trek co-star George Takei to Brad Altman.

Koenig was awarded the Inkpot Award in 1982.

Filmography

Television

Video games

Bibliography
 Warped Factors: A Neurotic's Guide to the Universe
 Chekov's Enterprise
 Buck Alice and the Actor-Robot
 Raver (comic book)
 Walter Koenig's Things to Come

References

External links

 
 
 
 

1936 births
20th-century American male actors
21st-century American male actors
American male screenwriters
American male television actors
American people of Lithuanian-Jewish descent
American people of Russian-Jewish descent
Ethical Culture Fieldston School alumni
Grinnell College alumni
Inkpot Award winners
Jewish American male actors
Jewish American writers
Living people
Male actors from Chicago
Neighborhood Playhouse School of the Theatre alumni
People from Inwood, Manhattan
University of California, Los Angeles alumni
Screenwriters from New York (state)
Screenwriters from Illinois